Cruzy (Languedocien: Crusi) is a commune in the Hérault department in southern France.

The mezzo-soprano Simone Couderc was born in Cruzy on 3 June 1911.

Population

See also
Communes of the Hérault department

References

Communes of Hérault